Barrow Island Airport  is a private airport, located at Barrow Island, Western Australia.

Airlines and Destinations

Notes
 Fly-in fly-out (FIFO) private charter operations only.

See also
 List of airports in Western Australia
 Aviation transport in Australia

References

External links
 Airservices Aerodromes & Procedure Charts

Pilbara airports